Cryptoblabes hemigypsa is a species of snout moth in the genus Cryptoblabes. It was described by Turner in 1913, and is known from Australia.

References

Moths described in 1913
Cryptoblabini